Ellie Greenwood (born 14 March 1979) is a British ultramarathon runner. She began her ultra career in 2008 and is a two-time 100km World Champion, winning the title in 2010 and 2014. She holds numerous course records, including those for the Western States 100, the Canadian Death Race, the JFK 50 Mile Run and the Knee Knackering North Shore Trail Run. She is the first British woman to win the 90 km Comrades Marathon in South Africa.

Greenwood was born in Dundee, Scotland, and spent most of her childhood in England. She moved to Canada after graduating from university to work for a ski tour operator and is now based in Vancouver.

Early life
Greenwood was born in Dundee, Scotland, on 14 March 1979. When she was 8 years old, her family moved to Norfolk, England. After graduating from university in 2001, she moved to Canada to work for a UK ski tour operator and has lived there ever since.

Career
Greenwood began her ultramarathon career in 2008, one of her first races being the 30-mile Knee Knackering North Shore Trail Run, a relatively short course known for its steep ascent and descent. That same year, Montrail, the footwear company, began sponsoring her.

In her first attempt at the distance, Greenwood won the Elk-Beaver 100k on Vancouver Island in May 2010, setting a new course record of 7:36, and qualified to represent Great Britain at the 2010 IAU 100 km World Championships. There, after battling with the race leader, 2006 World Champion and compatriot Lizzy Hawker, she took gold in a time of 7:29:05, helping Great Britain to first place in the team event and also in the jointly held IAU 100 km European Championships. In 2010, she also set new course records for the 125-kilometre Canadian Death Race, coming second overall and beating the previous record by more than an hour, and for the Knee Knackering North Shore Trail Run.

In 2011 Greenwood took on the Western States 100 in California and came first. She won the race again in 2012, when she set a new course record of 16:47:19, beating the previous best of 17:37:51 set by Ann Trason in 1994. In 2012, Greenwood also broke the women's course record for the JFK 50 Mile Run, coming in 10th overall, and was the winner of the Ultra-Trail du Mont-Blanc Courmayeur-Champex-Chamonix 101-km race.

Greenwood has competed three times in South Africa's 90-km Comrades Marathon. Run on undulating road through KwaZulu-Natal, it is said to be the oldest and most competitive ultramarathon in the world. She came fourth in 2011 and managed second place in 2012, just 72 seconds behind the winner. Throughout 2013, Greenwood was plagued with injuries. She returned to running slowly, focussing on the 2014 Comrades Marathon to keep her motivated. In 2014, with 18 km to go, she was eight minutes behind the race leader but she managed to recover the deficit and win in a time of 6:18:15. She is the first British woman to win the race, which had been dominated for the previous 11 years by the Russian twins Elena and Olesya Nurgalieva. Elena Nurgalieva still holds the course record which she set in 2006.

In November 2014, Greenwood lined up for the third time at the start of the IAU 100 km World Championships. Having won it in 2010, she led the British team in 2011 but pulled out at the 90 km mark, after suffering from vomiting for 40 km. In the 2014 race, Greenwood took the lead at the 55 km mark and held on to it to win gold in 7:30:48, eight minutes ahead of second placed Chiyuki Mochizuki of Japan and the third best time in the all-time list of British performances. Joanna Zakrzewski of the UK came third in 7:42:02. With Jo Meek coming fourth, Britain also won gold in the team event.

References

External links
 
 Ellie Greenwood at Power of 10
 Ellie Greenwood, Trail Running Tales
 
 

British ultramarathon runners
1979 births
British female marathon runners
Scottish female long-distance runners
Living people
Scottish female marathon runners
Sportspeople from Dundee
Female ultramarathon runners